West Charlotte High School (also called Dub-C or WC) is a comprehensive high school in west Charlotte, near Beatties Ford Road in Charlotte, North Carolina. It is state-funded.

History
West Charlotte High School was founded in 1938. The original campus became Northwest School of the Arts. It moved to its current location in 1954.

During the next three decades, the school became the pride of the community, and students won statewide competitions, with a strong connection between students and parents.

Beginning in the late 1960s, Swann v. Charlotte-Mecklenburg Board of Education ruled that cities had to desegregate their schools through busing, which created riots at many schools in the district, including at West Charlotte, as students from West Mecklenburg, Harding, Garinger, North Mecklenburg and Myers Park were bused to the school, starting in the fall of 1970. Over time, though, the school became nationally recognized as a model for student integration, with students and teachers coming from as far as Boston to view the success of the school. For the next 20 years, West Charlotte remained integrated until a series of court decisions stated that integration in Charlotte was a success and that busing was no longer needed.

On June 8, 2022, the current campus consisting of several buildings is scheduled to be closed and then demolished once a new building is completed next door. The former location will then become parking lots and athletic fields.

IB Diploma Programme
Since April 2005, West Charlotte has been an International Baccalaureate (IB) World School offering the IB Diploma Programme.

The IB Diploma Programme is an academically challenging and balanced program of education with final examinations that prepares students, ages 16 to 19, for higher education and life beyond. The program is taught over two years and has gained recognition from universities worldwide.

IB Diploma Programme students study six courses at higher level or standard level. Students select one subject from each of the following groups:
 Group 1: Language A1
 Group 2: Second Language
 Group 3: Individuals and societies
 Group 4: Experimental sciences
 Group 5: Mathematics and computer science
 Group 6: The arts

Students Against Violence Everywhere (SAVE)
In 1989, a West Charlotte student named Alex Orange was killed while trying to break up a fight at a party. His grieving classmates gathered and vowed to organize against violence in Alex's memory. The group formed Students Against Violence Everywhere (SAVE), with the vision that all students would be able to attend a school that is safe, secure, free of fear, and conducive to learning. Their signature color is orange, a reflection of Alex's surname.

SAVE members participated in local non-violence marches and the Carolina Carrousel Parade. During the school year, they visit elementary and junior high school, as well as television and radio shows, to perform skits showing how to act out non-violent solutions to problems.

Due to SAVE's efforts, there was a decrease in the number of violent incidents, weapons found in the school and the expulsion rate of students. This sparked an increase of chapters being started at other local high schools.

In 1992, SAVE received the 875th Daily Point of Light award by President George H.W. Bush. The award honors individuals and volunteer groups that have made a commitment to connect Americans through service to help meet critical needs in their communities.

Over almost 30 years, SAVE has grown from one chapter in Charlotte, North Carolina, to over 1,800 SAVE chapters with more than 200,000 members across the U.S. Today, SAVE serves youth in elementary schools, middle schools, high schools, colleges, and community youth-serving organizations in 46 states and several other countries. SAVE is coordinated by a North Carolina-based 501(c)(3) nonprofit organization, the National Association of Students Against Violence Everywhere, and it is still led by students, for students.

Performance
Due to low scores on standardized testing, it was feared the school would be closed. During the 2006–2007 school year, WC had the third worst performance in Mecklenburg County—surpassed only by Harding and Independence. The school has remained open, in part because of the response of its active alumni.

In 2007, pastors in the Charlotte area, officials at Johnson C. Smith University, and city council member and future Charlotte mayor Anthony Foxx formed the West Charlotte Mentoring Coalition, a collaborative effort to eliminate the 50% drop-out rate by providing mentoring and tutoring support for ninth graders at West Charlotte High School.

The group placed each of the 550 incoming freshmen with a mentor. West Charlotte principal Shelton Jeffries said the graduation rate at his school is a serious concern. He believes the work of the coalition will be powerful in reversing those trends by positively influencing the lives of young people.

Extracurricular activities
West Charlotte offers many extracurricular activities to encourage students' involvement in the school's community outside of the normal classroom setting. Those activities include:

Arts
 Band
 Chorus
 Dance
 Drawing/Painting
 Photography

Sports
 Basketball
 Baseball
 Cheerleading
 Football
 Soccer
 Softball
 Swimming
 Tennis
 Track and Field
 Volleyball
 Wrestling

Athletics
West Charlotte is affiliated with the North Carolina High School Athletic Association (NCHSAA). Their team name is the "Lions" with their school colors being maroon and gold. The marching band is one of the best known extracurricular activities at West Charlotte. They have performed at a bowl game every year since 2004, when they debuted at the Sugar Bowl. WC's stadium is called Jack Martin Stadium.

West Charlotte's main rivals are Independence High School and Harding University High School.

State Championships
 Men's Basketball: 1963, 1966, 1986, 1991, 1992, 1999, 2011, 2022
 Football: 1954, 1995
 Men's Track: 1995, 1999, 2003
 Men's Indoor Track: 1999
 Volleyball: 1997, 2000
 Women's Basketball: 2009

Notable alumni
 Kelly Alexander, politician
 Keith Belton, former NFL fullback
 Isaiah Blackmon, professional basketball player
 Calvin Brock, former professional boxer, competed at the 2000 Summer Olympics
 Thomas Harold "Junior" Burrough, former NBA player
 Mo Collins, former NFL offensive lineman
 Thereasea Elder, first African American public health nurse in Charlotte, North Carolina
 Anthony Foxx, lawyer, politician, and 54th Mayor of Charlotte
 Justin Gray, professional basketball player
 Trent Guy, former NFL and CFL player
 Pep Hamilton, college football and NFL coach
 Andrew Jordan, NFL tight end
 Goo Kennedy, former NBA player
 Jon Lindsay, recording artist
 Grier Martin, member of the North Carolina General Assembly representing the state's 34th House district
 Jeff McInnis, UNC basketball alumnus and former NBA player
 Kennedy Meeks, professional basketball player and 2017 NCAA champion with North Carolina
 Pettis Norman, NFL tight end
 Maureen O'Boyle, television reporter and news anchor, previously on A Current Affair and Extra
 Wali Rainer, NFL linebacker
 Ruth Samuelson, member of the North Carolina General Assembly representing the state's 104th House district
 Mike Sprayberry, North Carolina Director of Emergency Management
 David S. Taylor, business executive
 Anne Tompkins, served as the United States Attorney for the United States District Court for the Western District of North Carolina
 Dave Waymer, NFL safety and 1987 Pro Bowl selection
 Patrick Williams, Professional basketball player for the Chicago Bulls
 Steve Wilks, Former NFL defensive coordinator for the Cleveland Browns
 Everett Withers, college football and NFL coach

References

Public high schools in North Carolina
Educational institutions established in 1938
Schools in Charlotte, North Carolina
1938 establishments in North Carolina